The MV Canberra Maru was an  freighter built by Mitsubishi Zosen Kaisha, Nagasaki, Japan, in 1936 for Osaka Shosen Kaisha. The ship was one of the targets of the British attacks during the Battle off Endau in January 1942. She was sunk by American aircraft near Guadalcanal, 14 November 1942.

References

Ships built by Mitsubishi Heavy Industries
World War II merchant ships of Japan
Ships sunk by US aircraft
Maritime incidents in November 1942
1936 ships